Nivala-Haapajärvi sub-region is a subdivision of Northern Ostrobothnia and one of the Sub-regions of Finland since 2009.

Municipalities
 Haapajärvi
 Kärsämäki
 Nivala
 Pyhäjärvi
 Reisjärvi

Politics
Results of the 2018 Finnish presidential election:

 Sauli Niinistö   53.1%
 Matti Vanhanen   17.0%
 Paavo Väyrynen   11.8%
 Laura Huhtasaari   8.8%
 Pekka Haavisto   4.5%
 Merja Kyllönen   2.7%
 Tuula Haatainen   1.8%
 Nils Torvalds   0.2%

Sub-regions of Finland
Geography of North Ostrobothnia